Mad River Township, Ohio may refer to:
Mad River Township, Champaign County, Ohio
Mad River Township, Clark County, Ohio
Mad River Township, Montgomery County, Ohio (defunct, now part of Riverside, Ohio)

Ohio township disambiguation pages